Conley Michael "Connie" Forey (born October 18, 1950) is a Canadian retired professional ice hockey left wing. He played four games in the National Hockey League with the St. Louis Blues and one game in the World Hockey Association with the Chicago Cougars. He was drafted in the fourth round of the 1970 NHL Amateur Draft.

External links

1950 births
Living people
Amarillo Wranglers players
Canadian ice hockey left wingers
Chicago Cougars players
Denver Spurs (WHL) players
Fort Wayne Komets players
Hershey Bears players
Ice hockey people from Montreal
Mohawk Valley Comets (NAHL) players
New Haven Nighthawks players
Ottawa 67's players
Pittsburgh Penguins draft picks
St. Louis Blues players
Canadian expatriate ice hockey players in the United States